Alberto Leguelé (born 28 February 1953) is a Brazilian footballer. He competed in the men's tournament at the 1976 Summer Olympics.

References

External links
 

1953 births
Living people
Brazilian footballers
Brazil international footballers
Olympic footballers of Brazil
Footballers at the 1976 Summer Olympics
People from Santo Amaro, Bahia
Association football forwards
Association football midfielders
Sportspeople from Bahia
Pan American Games medalists in football
Footballers at the 1975 Pan American Games
Pan American Games gold medalists for Brazil
Medalists at the 1975 Pan American Games